Parsippany is a census-designated place (CDP) and the central community in the township of Parsippany-Troy Hills, Morris County, New Jersey, United States. It includes development around Lake Parsippany, as well as neighborhoods in the eastern part of the township, between Troy Hills to the south and Lake Hiawatha to the north. The southern end of Boonton Reservoir is also in the CDP.

Interstate 80 and Interstate 287 intersect in the center of the CDP. I-80 leads east  to its terminus at Interstate 95 in Teaneck and west  to the Delaware Water Gap, while I-287 leads northeast  to Suffern, New York, and southwest  to Somerville.

Parsippany was first listed as a CDP prior to the 2020 census. However, in common usage, "Parsippany" usually applies to the entire township.

Demographics

References 

Census-designated places in Morris County, New Jersey
Census-designated places in New Jersey
Parsippany-Troy Hills, New Jersey